The National Weather Service Raleigh, North Carolina (RAH) is a local Weather Forecast Office for central North Carolina. The NWS in Raleigh serves 31 counties in NC and these 31 counties have a population of 7.74 million people, including the cities of Raleigh, Durham, Greensboro, Winston-Salem, and Fayetteville, North Carolina.

Description
The NWS In Raleigh began in January 1887. In 1896, NWS Raleigh moved to the Fisher Building, and remained there until 1908, when the office moved to the fourth floor of the Masonic Temple in Raleigh. It would remain here until December 1940. In December 1940, the office moved to the Administration Building at Raleigh-Durham International Airport (called Raleigh Municipal Airport at the time), and would move a few times on the airport grounds over the years. In November 1979, NWS Raleigh moved to the Cargo Building at RDU, and would remain there until 1994. On January 19, 1994, NWS Raleigh moved to the Centennial Campus at North Carolina State University, though a skeleton staff remained at RDU to take observations and man the WSR-74 radar until June 30, 1996.

NWS Raleigh Operates 8 NOAA Weather Radio transmitters throughout central North Carolina.

NWS Raleigh Also operates a WSR-88D Doppler weather radar with the Callsign, KRAX and also operates a TDWR With the callsign TRDU.

References

https://www.weather.gov/rah/
https://www.weather.gov/rah/virtualtourwhere
https://www.weather.gov/nwr/sites?site=WWF60
https://www.weather.gov/nwr/sites?site=WXL58 
https://www.weather.gov/nwr/sites?site=WNG597
https://www.weather.gov/nwr/sites?site=WXL50
https://www.weather.gov/nwr/sites?site=WNG706
https://www.weather.gov/nwr/sites?site=WNG586 
https://www.weather.gov/nwr/sites?site=WXL59 
https://www.weather.gov/nwr/sites?site=WXL42

External links 

 Guide to the United States Weather Bureau, Raleigh Office, Records 1887-1972

Raleigh
Organizations based in Raleigh, North Carolina